Tha Mexakinz is the second full-length album by Latin hip hop duo, Tha Mexakinz. It was released on August 13, 1996, by Wild West Records.

Track listing
Introlude
U Don't Even Know Me
Never in This World
Plead Insanity
Problems
La Plaga
2 Many MC's
Confessions
Frost Interlude
Instinct
Provoke the Extreme
Burnin' Hot
Realism
Headz or Taylz
The Wake Up Show (feat. Xzibit and Chino XL)
2 Many MC's (Remix)

References

External links
 

1996 albums
Tha Mexakinz albums